Yurydychna Akademiya  is a Ukrainian professional men's volleyball team, based in Kharkiv, playing in Ukrainian Super League.

Achievements
 Ukrainian Super League
  (x2) 2003, 2004
  (x4) 2001, 2002, 2015, 2016

Notable players
Notable, former or current players of the club.

References

Ukrainian volleyball clubs
Sport in Kharkiv